Archiminolia strobilos is a species of sea snail, a marine gastropod mollusk in the family Solariellidae.

Description

Distribution

References

 Vilvens C. (2009). New species and new records of Solariellidae (Gastropoda: Trochoidea) from Indonesia and Taiwan. Novapex 10(3): 69-96

External links

strobilos
Gastropods described in 2009